1993 Indian Ocean Games in Seychelles

Played at Stade Linite in Victoria, Seychelles

Group stage

Group A

Group B

Knockout stage

Semi-final

Third place match

Final

Final ranking

Per statistical convention in football, matches decided in extra time are counted as wins and losses, while matches decided by penalty shoot-out are counted as draws.

See also
Indian Ocean Island Games
Football at the Indian Ocean Island Games

References
rsssf.com 
national-football-teams.com

1993
Indian Ocean Games 1993